Prof Alan Wilfrid Cranbrook Menzies FRSE (pronounced MING-iss; 31 July 1877 – 8 September 1966) was a Scottish-born chemist who later taught at Princeton University.

Life
Menzies was born in Edinburgh on 31 July 1877, son of Thomas Hunter Menzies, master draper, and Helen Charlotte (née Cranbrook). His name on the birth certificate does not include Cranbrook. He was educated at Daniel Stewart's College and then studied science at the University of Edinburgh. graduating with MA and BSc in 1898.

In 1900 he was elected a Fellow of the Royal Society of Edinburgh. His proposers were Alexander Crum Brown, John Gibson, Sir Arthur Mitchell, and Sir John Batty Tuke.

In 1910 he emigrated to the United States to take up postgraduate studies at the University of Chicago where he gained a PhD. Following the retirement of Professor Frank Fanning Jewett in 1912, Menzies was appointed head of chemistry at Oberlin College. Two years later he was offered a professorship at Princeton University where he taught until he retired in 1945.

He married Mary Isabella Dickson on 20 March 1908 at All Saints Church, Edinburgh. They had one child, Elizabeth Grantcranbrook Menzies, born on 24 June 1915, in Princeton; she died there, unmarried, on 12 January 2003.

Menzies died in Foothill Acres Nursing Home in Hillsborough, NJ on 8 September 1966.

Publications
Several of the publications cited here are with co-authors.

References

1877 births
1966 deaths
Scientists from Edinburgh
People educated at Stewart's Melville College
Alumni of the University of Edinburgh
Scottish chemists
Fellows of the Royal Society of Edinburgh
Princeton University faculty
University of Chicago alumni
Scottish emigrants to the United States
Oberlin College faculty
Academics from Edinburgh